Myrmecia rowlandi is a species of bull ant native to Australia. They are usually spotted in the Australian state of Queensland, notably in Cairns.

Notable features
Not much is known about Myrmecia rowlandi, but workers typically are 13-21 mm long. Their heads and thoraces are black, their legs are a brownish black colour, mandibles are yellow, and antennae are red.

References

Myrmeciinae
Insects of Australia
Insects described in 1910